Vegreville was a federal electoral district in Alberta, Canada, that was represented in the House of Commons of Canada from 1925 to 1997.

This riding was created in 1924 from parts of Strathcona and Victoria ridings.

It was abolished in 1996 when it was merged into Lakeland riding.

Election results

† William Halina campaigned under the United Progressive party banner which may have been related to the Progressive Unity united front candidates supported by the Communist Party in Saskatchewan.

See also 

 List of Canadian federal electoral districts
 Past Canadian electoral districts

External links
 

Former federal electoral districts of Alberta
1924 establishments in Alberta
1996 disestablishments in Alberta